Keep the Faith is an album by Bon Jovi.

Keep the Faith may also refer to:

Music
Keep the Faith: An Evening with Bon Jovi, a live television concert
Keep the Faith: The Videos, a video release by Bon Jovi
 Keep the Faith, a musical produced by the Summer Performing Arts Company

Albums
Keep the Faith (Bryn Haworth album)
Keep the Faith (Faith Evans album)
Keep the Faith (Black Oak Arkansas album), or the title track
Keep the Faith, an album The Business, or the title track
Keep the Faith, an EP by Georgia Satellites

Songs
"Keep the Faith" (Bon Jovi song) (1992)
"Keep the Faith" (KAT-TUN song)
"Keep the Faith" (Tamara Gachechiladze song), representing Georgia in the Eurovision Song Contest 2017
"Keep the Faith", a song by Michael Jackson from Dangerous
"Keep the Faith", a 1968 song by The American Breed

Other uses
 Keep the Faith, a 1972 American comedy TV movie starring Bert Convy

See also
Keep the Faith, Baby!, a spoken-word album by Adam Clayton Powell, Jr.
Keeping the Faith (disambiguation)
"...I have kept the faith", an excerpt from the Second Epistle to Timothy